Anderson dos Santos Gomes (born 3 January 1998), known as just Anderson, is a Brazilian professional footballer who plays for Austrian Football Bundesliga club Austria Lustenau.

Club career
On 31 August 2021, he joined Dornbirn on loan for the 2021–22 season.

On 14 January 2022, Anderson signed a six-month contract with Austria Lustenau.

Honours
Austria Lustenau
 Austrian Football Second League: 2021–22

References

1998 births
Living people
Brazilian footballers
Brazilian expatriate footballers
Association football fullbacks
Grêmio Osasco Audax Esporte Clube players
SC Rheindorf Altach players
FC Dornbirn 1913 players
SC Austria Lustenau players
Austrian Football Bundesliga players
2. Liga (Austria) players
Austrian Regionalliga players
Brazilian expatriate sportspeople in Austria
Expatriate footballers in Austria
Footballers from São Paulo